The 1952 United States presidential election in Iowa took place on November 4, 1952, as part of the 1952 United States presidential election. Iowa voters chose ten representatives, or electors, to the Electoral College, who voted for president and vice president.

Iowa was won by Columbia University President Dwight D. Eisenhower (R–New York), running with Senator Richard Nixon, with 63.75% of the popular vote, against Adlai Stevenson (D–Illinois), running with Senator John Sparkman, with 35.59% of the popular vote. As of the 2020 presidential election, this is the last of only two presidential elections – alongside Warren G. Harding’s triumph in 1920 – in which a candidate won every county in Iowa.

Results

Results by county

See also
 United States presidential elections in Iowa

References

Iowa
1952
1952 Iowa elections